The 1969 British Columbia general election was the 29th general election in the Province of British Columbia, Canada. It was held to elect members of the Legislative Assembly of British Columbia. The election  was called on July 21, 1969, and held on August 27, 1969.  The new legislature met for the first time on January 22, 1970.

The conservative Social Credit Party of British Columbia was re-elected with a majority in the legislature to a seventh term in government. It won over 46% of the popular vote.

The opposition New Democratic Party of British Columbia won about one-third of the popular vote, roughly the same as in the previous election, but lost four of its 16 seats in the legislature.

The Liberal Party of British Columbia lost one of its six seats.

Results

Note:

* Party did not nominate candidates in the previous election.

See also
List of British Columbia political parties

Further reading
 

1969
1969 elections in Canada
1969 in British Columbia
August 1969 events in Canada